Claude Belot (born 11 July 1936) is a former member of the Senate of France, representing the Charente-Maritime department. He is a member of the Union for a Popular Movement.

External links
Page on the Senate website

1936 births
Living people
Union for a Popular Movement politicians
French Senators of the Fifth Republic
Senators of Charente-Maritime